The following is a discography of Thin Lizzy, an Irish hard rock band formed in Dublin in 1969. Originally led by frontman, bass guitarist, songwriter and singer Phil Lynott, their most commercially successful songs are "The Boys Are Back in Town", "Whiskey in the Jar" and "Jailbreak", all major international hits still played regularly on hard rock and classic rock radio stations.

The current line-up of Thin Lizzy restrict themselves to playing live and not recording new material as Thin Lizzy – new material by current members of Thin Lizzy is released under the name Black Star Riders. Thin Lizzy still perform on an occasional basis and the line-up now consists of longtime guitarist Scott Gorham, keyboardist Darren Wharton, and four other members who were not present during the band's main recording career.

Studio albums

Live albums

Archive albums

Compilation albums

Extended plays

Singles

Peak chart positions are shown for the following singles in the following territories. A shaded box indicates that this single was not released in the territory shown. Blank spaces indicate that there is no information available regarding its chart position. A dash indicates a non-charting release. Many of these singles were released in other countries, but chart information is not available.

Notes
1 In some countries, "Whiskey in the Jar" was released in early 1973.
2 Credited to "The Greedies" - Lynott, Gorham, Downey, Steve Jones and Paul Cook.  This line-up was frequently subtitled as "Thin Lizzy And The Sex Pistols"

Videos

References

 
Rock music group discographies
Discographies of Irish artists